¿Quién quiere ser millonario? (English translation: Who wants to be a millionaire?) was a Peruvian game show based on the original British format of Who Wants to Be a Millionaire? The show was hosted by Guido Lombardi. The main goal of the game was to win 1 million Peruvian nuevo sol (US$295,000) by answering 15 multiple-choice questions correctly. There were three lifelines - fifty fifty, phone a friend and ask the audience. ¿Quién quiere ser millonario? was broadcast from 2001 to 2002. It was shown on the Peruvian TV station Canal 13. When a contestant got the fifth question correct, he left with at least S/. 1,000. When a contestant got the tenth question correct, he left with at least S/. 32,000. The biggest prize won on the show was S/. 32,000. Second season of the show was announced but due to internal problems at the network this never happened.

Money tree

References

Who Wants to Be a Millionaire?
2001 Peruvian television series debuts
2002 Peruvian television series endings
2000s Peruvian television series